The jukjangchang, literally bamboo long spear, is a Korean weapon.

The jukjangchang is first mentioned in the Muyesinbo (1759). The spear was made from bamboo and is about 4.2 meters long.  The  jukjangchang was made either or whole bamboo stalk or pieces of bamboo glued and woven together. The latter type was stronger.
 
The bamboo made the jukjangchang more flexible than the ordinary jangchang. Soldiers could use the jukjangchang to keep the enemy at a distance.

References

Traditional Korean weapons
Polearms
Spears